Hiromitsu Takano (born 25 August 1959) is a Japanese judoka. He competed in the men's half-middleweight event at the 1984 Summer Olympics.

References

External links
 

1959 births
Living people
Japanese male judoka
Olympic judoka of Japan
Judoka at the 1984 Summer Olympics
Place of birth missing (living people)
20th-century Japanese people
21st-century Japanese people